Jambyn Batmönkh (10 March 1926 – 14 May 1997) was a Mongolian communist political leader and economics professor. He was the leader of Mongolia from 1984 to its transition into democracy in 1990.

Early life
Batmönkh was born in Khyargas sum of Uvs aimag on 10 March 1926. When starting primary school, he took his brother's name, Jamba, as a surname. After graduating seventh grade in his native Uvs aimag, he entered the National University of Mongolia's two year preparatory program. From 1947 to 1951, he studied at the National University's School of Economics.

He met his future wife when they were both 16 years old. Both Batmönkh and Daariimaa were housed in the same dormitory, when they were studying in the National University of Mongolia's School of Economics, and the Agricultural Technical College, respectively. They were married one year later. Daariimaa worked for 33 years at the National University of Mongolia Library, until 1988, when she retired.

Early political career
Batmönkh became a member of the ruling Mongolian People's Revolutionary Party (MPRP) in 1948. In 1951, Batmönkh started work as a professor at the Pedagogical University. In 1973, after working as a professor and director at the university for over twenty years, he was promoted to Minister of Science (Superintendent of the Department of Science Education of the Party's Central Bureau). In the spring of 1974, he was promoted to Vice Chairman of the Council of Ministers of the MPRP. In June 1974, during a Session of the People's Great Khural, he was further promoted to the post of Chairman of the Council of Ministers, an office analogous to Prime Minister.

Leadership of Mongolia (1984–1990)
In 1984, along with D. Molomjamts, Batmönkh played a key role in easing Tsedenbal's way out of power. In 1984, he became the head of state when the party's long-time leader, Yumjaagiin Tsedenbal, was ousted in a party congress. Batmönkh strengthened Mongolia's alliance with the Soviet Union, but as in many other communist countries, there was much pressure for the party to give up power. He also called for the improvement of relations with China, saying during a meeting with President Kim Il sung while on a state visit to Pyongyang in November 1986 that "renewing the development of Sino-Mongolian relations is important for our two countries’ people's common interest".

 

Batmönkh's reign contributed to the creation of major energy (the construction of Ulaanbaatar and Erdenet power stations, and the connection of the Central high-power electric grid with the Soviet Union's Siberian Grid) and mining (the beginning of the operations of Erdenet and Baganuur coal mines, and Bor-Ondor gypsum mine) infrastructure, together with, various other light production and food processing factories.

Role in the Mongolian Revolution of 1990
In late 1989, the Democratic movement garnered strength. In March 1990 the first democratic alliance, called Ardchilsan Kholboo (Mongolian Democratic Union), launched a hunger strike urging that the communist government led by Batmönkh resign.

Batmönkh decreed that the only way to end the situation was the resignation of the MPRP's Politburo, and maintained a strict policy of never using force. A book was later published with title "Never use force." After discussions with the members of the Politburo and after the Eighth Congress of the Party's Central Committee, the MPRP officially stepped down from power on 9 March 1990.

Batmönkh's widow later recounted: "It was March of 1990. Batmönkh was sitting at home, preparing for his speech to the MPRP's 8th Congress. The telephone rang, and after speaking a while he suddenly said "We few Mongolians should never make each other's noses bleed" and threw the phone away. It was not typical of him, he was a very calm person. He then said "Some leaders have come together and asked me to sign something. I'll go there and come back". He kept asking for his tie, not seeing that it was right next to him. To think about it now, he was very flustered and nervous. He went out without eating, just drinking a cup of tea at the door. I stayed at home, nervous that the protestors had clashed outside. In reality, they (others in Politburo and in authority) had asked him to sign a draft of a decree to crack down and scatter the protest outside. People who were present there later recalled that Batmönkh said "I will never sign this. We few Mongols have not yet come to the point that we will make each other's noses bleed," smacked the table, and left the room."

"He had resigned by the time he came home that evening. He didn't say what happened to me in detail. He was never a person to talk much about work. He was a very calm person," his widow said.

After retirement
In 1990, most of his family members became unemployed after being accused of political corruption. He and his wife made bread and sold deel and gutals. From 1992 until his death, he lived in Dambadarjaa (Sukhbaatar district) while planting vegetables and fruits.

He was privately critical of the new administration (particularly of Punsalmaagiin Ochirbat, the new president) after his retirement. He died in 1997.

In popular culture 
Batmönkh's role in the 1990 democratic movement was dramatized in the 2016 Mongolian film "Don't Forget" ("Бүү март").

References

Mongolian communists
Speakers of the State Great Khural
1926 births
1997 deaths
Mongolian People's Party politicians
Prime Ministers of Mongolia
Heads of state of Mongolia
Communism in Mongolia
Recipients of the Order of Lenin
Recipients of the Order of Friendship of Peoples
National University of Mongolia alumni
People from Uvs Province